Pellamyzon is a genus of trematodes in the family Opecoelidae. It consists of one species, Pellamyzon abitionis (McFarlane, 1936) Gibson & Bray, 1982.

References

Opecoelidae
Plagiorchiida genera